HMS Viper was a  Viper-class torpedo boat destroyer (or "TBD") built for the British Royal Navy in 1899 by Hawthorn Leslie and Company at Hebburn on the River Tyne.

She was notable for being the first warship to use steam turbine propulsion  and was manufactured by Parsons Marine. There were four shafts, with two propellers on each, one inboard and one outboard of the shaft A-bracket.

Viper and another turbine-powered ship, the Armstrong Whitworth special-type  were both lost to accidents in 1901: Viper foundered on rocks in fog during naval manoeuvres near Alderney on 3 August 1901, while Cobra broke her back in a storm in the North Sea on 18 September 1901.

Construction and design 
 
Following the success of the turbine-powered yacht Turbinia, the British Admiralty, whose previous attempts at acquiring destroyers faster than the standard "thirty-Knotters", the reciprocating-engined Albatross, Express and Arab had been unsuccessful, placed an order on 4 March 1898 with Parsons Marine for a turbine-powered destroyer, HMS Viper. Parsons subcontracted the ship's hull to Hawthorn Leslie and Company of Tyneside, with Viper being laid down later that year.

The turbines, supplied by Parsons, drove four shafts, with two propellers per shaft. The outer shafts were driven by high-pressure turbines and the inner shafts by low-pressure turbines, while the inner pair also was fitted with separate turbines for running astern. No cruising engines were fitted. Four Yarrow boilers fed the turbines, the uptakes from which were routed to three funnels.

Viper carried a gun armament of a single  QF 12 pounder 12 cwt ( calibre) gun on a platform on the ship's conning tower (in practice the platform was also used as the ship's bridge) and five 6-pounder (57 mm) guns, together with two 18 inch (450 mm) torpedo tubes, the standard armament for contemporary Royal Navy destroyers.

Viper was launched on 6 September 1899.

While the ship's turbines allowed the ship to reach very high speeds in trials, with low levels of vibration, fuel consumption was very high, and the ship's turbines, which had been optimised for high speed, were inefficient at slower speeds. This made Viper of limited use to the Fleet, being capable of patrolling off Alderney from her base at Portland for only 24 hours before being forced to return to base due to lack of fuel.

Loss of Viper

On 3 August 1901 Viper sailed from Portland to take part in a search as part of the annual fleet exercises. Arriving off Alderney's Casquet Rocks in mid-afternoon, she spent some time searching the area. Visibility was generally good, although there were patches of mist, and she was able to sight a vessel playing the 'enemy' in the exercise.

By early evening the mist had become fog and she slowed to 10 knots. At 17:23 breakers were spotted on the starboard bow and she turned to port, but found rocks all around and soon grounded. The destroyer fought clear, but soon grounded again and lost her propellers, finally drifting broadside onto the rocks. By 18:45, with the engine room flooded and Viper heeling over, she was abandoned. A local pilot's launch arrived to offer assistance and towed the boats ashore with the crew. Daylight on the following day showed her on Renonquet Rocks and beyond recovery. The damage increased until her back was broken and the bow section sheared around perpendicular to the keel.

The subsequent enquiry found that the commanding officer, Lieutenant William Speke, had failed to exercise proper precautions while steaming in fog. In particular, he had not ensured that an accurate record of the courses steered was maintained. He was reprimanded. The navigating officer, Sub-Lieutenant Kenneth Mackenzie Grieve, was informed that he had "incurred their Lordships' displeasure", having inserted the missing data into the log following the wreck.

In December 1901 Vipers wreck was sold to Messrs. Agnes and Co., of Southampton, for £100.

References

Bibliography
 
 
 
 
 
 Hepper, David (2006). British Warship Losses in the Ironclad Era 1860-1919 Chatham Publishing.

External links
Photo of Viper after having run aground

 

Viper-class destroyers
1899 ships
Ships built on the River Tyne
Maritime incidents in 1901
Shipwrecks in the Atlantic Ocean